Julie Bertagna (born 1962) is a Scottish author who has written real life and science fiction novels for both children and young adults. Her books have been shortlisted for several literature awards, including the Carnegie Medal. Her novel Exodus was the winner of the Lancashire County Library Children's Book of the Year Award. Soundtrack, her second novel for young adults, won a Scottish Arts Council Award, the second highest award ever given to a Scottish children's writer.

Biography 
Bertagna was born in Kilmarnock, Ayrshire, and moved to Glasgow when she was seven years old.

After receiving an MA Hons in English Language and Literature at Glasgow University she worked as an editor for a small magazine, then moved into teaching before working as a freelance journalist for various publications. She published her first book, The Spark Gap, when she was 25 years old.

She currently writes full-time and lives in the West End of Glasgow with her husband Riccardo and young daughter.

Influences 
Bertagna's writing often reflects her Scottish background, sometimes being set in the country. An example of this is The Spark Gap, which she wrote specifically to include characters like the children she was teaching in Glasgow.

Other influences of her work include global warming and climate change, being major themes in her novel Exodus, which took the "highly commended" award, the equivalent of second prize, at the first Eco Prize, held by the Friends of the Earth Scotland. Her first novel for Young Picador, Exodus, was shortlisted for the Whitbread Award and was described by The Guardian as "a miracle of a novel".

Her book The Opposite of Chocolate deals with issues of teenage pregnancy.

Notable works 

Bertagna has written books for both children and young adults. Her first book was The Spark Gap. Her most recent book is Zenith, the sequel to Exodus. Both were written for young adults.

Major works
 The Spark Gap (1996)  (publisher: MacMillan Children's Books)
 Exodus (2002) 
 Zenith (2007) 
 Aurora (2011)  (publisher: Pan Macmillan)

Other works 
The Ice Cream Machine (Macmillan Children's, 1998) 
Soundtrack (Pan Macmillan, 1999) 
Bungee Hero (Barrington Stoke, 1999) 
Dolphin Boy (Mammoth, 1999) 
Clumsy Clumps and the Baby Moon (Egmont Books, limited, 1999) 
'"Amphibian City" (1999) (In Phenomenal Future Stories, edited by Tony Bradman) 
The Opposite of Chocolate (Young Picador, 2003)   
Ice Cream Machine Totally Fizzbombed (Macmillan Children's, 2004)

Television series 

In January 2004 a television series for children was created based on Bertagna's book The Ice Cream Machine. The programme was produced in a co-production of Five with SMG and the Gaelic Broadcasting Committee. It was aimed at six- to nine-year-olds and was to be broadcast in both English and Gaelic.

References

External links
 Official site

1962 births
Living people
Scottish children's writers
Alumni of the University of Glasgow
Scottish science fiction writers
British science fiction writers
Women science fiction and fantasy writers
People from Kilmarnock
British writers of young adult literature